Shiri Maimon is the debut album by Israeli singer Shiri Maimon, released on September 2, 2005, and certified gold just a few months after its release. It combines elements of pop and soul.
The first single from the album, and shiri's first commercial single ever, "Ad Shetavin Oti" ("Until You Understand Me"", Hebrew: עד שתבין אותי) was released on November 2004.

Track listing
 "Ahava Qt'ana" (A Small Love) — 3:45
 "Le'an SheLo Tilkhi" (Wherever You'd Go) — 4:03
 "Otkha" (To You) — 3:20
 "Le Qolkha" (To Your Voice) — 4:38
 "'Ad SheTavin Oti" (Until You Understand Me) — 3:06
 "Tivrakh" (Run Away) — 2:58
 "Kama Pe'amim" (How Many Times) — 3:38
 "Kvar Lo Shelkha" (No Longer Yours) — 3:47
 "Zman Shel Khesed" (Time of Grace) — 4:12
 "MeRakhoq" (From a Distance) — 2:57
 "Hasheket Shenish'ar" (The Silence That Remains) — 3:01
 "Le'an SheLo Tilkhi" (Wherever You'd Go) (Henree's Drum Remix) — 5:50

References

2005 debut albums
Shiri Maimon albums